Boogie Belgique is a Belgian experimental hip hop and electro swing band (self-described as swing hop) started by Oswald Cromheecke in 2012.

Members 
 Oswald Cromheecke (2012–present)
 Cedric Van Overstraeten: trumpet
 Aiko Devriendt: keys
 Martijn Van Den Broek: drums
 Emily Van Overstraeten: vocals
 Ambroos De Schepper: saxophone

Discography 
 2012: Blueberry Hill
 2012: Time for a Boogie
 2013: Nightwalker vol. 1
 2014: Nightwalker vol. 2
 2016: Volta
 2022: Machine

Blueberry Hill and Nightwalker vol. 1 and 2 have been released for free under a Creative Commons license.

References 

Belgian hip hop groups
Experimental hip hop
Electro swing musicians